The Return of Koerner, Ray and Glover is an album by Koerner, Ray & Glover, released in 1965. It was their last recording for Elektra and it would be seven years before the trio's next release.

Koerner appeared at the 1965 Newport Folk Festival accompanied by Glover, one of the few times the two performed without Dave Ray.

The Return of Koerner, Ray and Glover was reissued by Red House Records in 1999.

Reception

Allmusic critic Jeff Burger wrote "...this beautifully remasters  1965 collection is filled with the humor, rhythm, soulful vocals and top-notch material that made the outfit such a standout... If you like this kind of music, it's a safe bet that you'll love this album." In his JazzTimes review, music critic Bill Milkowski called the album "A quintessential white boy blues album that helped fuel the '60s blues boom." Reviewed in Mother Jones, the reissue was called "... driving, foot-stomping, aggressively acoustic blues that seamlessly meshes original composition with material from the great bluesmen... an album of remarkable breadth, much more than the sum of its parts."

Track listing
 "I Want to See My Baby" (John Koerner) – 3:05
 "Titanic" (Lead Belly) – 4:05
 "You've Got to Be Careful" (Koerner) – 2:50
 "Looky Looky Yonder" (Lead Belly, Alan Lomax, John Lomax) – 1:10
 "Statesboro Blues" (Blind Willie McTell) – 3:05
 "Eugene C." (Koerner) – 2:25
 "Goin' to the Country" (Koerner) – 2:40
 "The Boys Was Shootin' It Out Last Night" (Koerner) – 2:45
 "Poor Howard" (Lead Belly, Lomax, Lomax) – 2:25
 "I Don't Want to Be Terrified" (Koerner) – 3:50
 "Don't Let Your Right Hand Know What Your Left Hand Do" (Tony Glover) – 3:05
 "Lonesome Road" (traditional) – 2:35
 "England Blues" (Koerner) – 2:35
 "Packin' Truck" (Lead Belly, Lomax, Lomax) – 3:55
 "John Hardy" (traditional) – 2:25

Personnel
Tony "Little Sun" Glover – harmonica, vocals, liner notes
"Spider" John Koerner – guitar, vocals
Dave "Snaker" Ray – guitar, vocals
Production notes
Paul Rothchild – producer
Chris Frymire – remixing, mastering
Eric Peltoniemi – reissue producer, design, layout design

References

External links
Koerner, Ray and Glover discography

1965 albums
Koerner, Ray & Glover albums
Albums produced by Paul A. Rothchild
Elektra Records albums
Red House Records albums